Dali is a town under the administration of Teng County, Guangxi, China. , it administers Dali Residential Community and the following 18 villages:
Dali Village
Litian Village
Chaolin Village
Ping'an Village
Guo'an Village
Dong'an Village
Xing'an Village
Gupan Village
Xiangjiang Village
Yonghe Village
Laili Village
He'an Village
Shangrong Village
Huazhou Village
Lida Village
Baizhu Village
Taixing Village
Fudou Village

References 

Towns of Guangxi
Teng County